Raymond Lory (17 August 1926 – 28 January 2018) was a French politician who served as mayor of Joué-lès-Tours between 1956 and 1995. He was elected to the National Assembly via proportional representation in 1986, where he represented Indre-et-Loire until 1988.

Biography 
As the mayor of Joué-lès-Tours from 1956 to 1995, Raymond Lory oversaw the development and transformation of the city. Under his term, the population of the city grew from 6,500 to 36,000, which made it the second largest city in Indre-et-Loire.

During his term as the representative of Indre-et-Loire, he was behind Michelin's move to Joué-lès-Tours, kicking off the city's development.

References

1926 births
2018 deaths
People from Joué-lès-Tours
Mayors of places in Centre-Val de Loire
Union for French Democracy politicians
Deputies of the 8th National Assembly of the French Fifth Republic